Alaina Antoinette Hicks (born May 9, 1993), known by her stage name Bonnie Rotten, is an American former pornographic actress, feature dancer, fetish model, and director. In 2014, she became the first alt-porn star to win the AVN Award for Female Performer of the Year.

Early life 

Rotten was born and raised in Cincinnati. She is of Italian, German, Polish, and Jewish descent. She was raised by her grandparents. She says her first sexual experience was at the age of 12 with a boy who was 13, and claims to have had her first sexual experience with multiple male partners at age 16.

Career 

Rotten started her career as a fetish model for the magazine Girls and Corpses, which took note of her after she won the Ms. Dead Indiana Beauty Pageant at the Indianapolis Days of the Dead convention. She entered the adult industry in early 2012. Previously, Rotten also worked as a model in car and motorcycle shows. She also began stripping on her eighteenth birthday using the stage name "Dixie". Her routine as a stripper was to always wear American flag bikinis and dance only to Southern rock.

In September 2012, she had a breast augmentation. The company Digital Sin produced two films focused entirely on her, Meet Bonnie that was a sales chart topping success and The Gangbang of Bonnie Rotten. She has done at least fourteen videos featured on Kink.com, including some subjecting her to bondage and pain. Much of her work has focused on her ability to ejaculate. She has said that this was a technique taught to her by fellow performer Veronica Avluv. Rotten credits adult video performer Nina Hartley with helping her make the transition from modeling to porn.

In 2014, Rotten reprised the role of "Max Candy" in the porn remake of Cape Fear and cited Robert De Niro's performance in the 1991 version as her inspiration for the role.

In May 2014, Rotten filed a lawsuit against pornographic actor and producer, Max Hardcore, alleging appropriation of her identity, defamation and intentional infliction of emotional distress, over his publication of a scene the two had recorded together in 2012. In July 2014, Max Hardcore filed a countersuit over image rights, alleging that Rotten had breached the agreement that she signed.

In October 2014, the German-based company Digital Sports Innovation announced the availability of Bonnie Rotten figurines, ranging from five to fourteen inches tall.

In February 2015, the sex toy manufacturer Pipedream announced that it was shipping the "Bonnie Rotten Signature Collection". In April 2015, Rotten generated publicity in Manhattan by going topless in Times Square, Washington Square Park and on the subway.

In June 2015, the daily fantasy sports company Draftster announced that it had signed Rotten to an "exclusive sponsorship and promotional deal."

Starting in 2013, Rotten appeared as a featured performer at strip clubs in numerous cities. In October 2015, The Lee Network announced an exclusive agreement with Rotten to represent her for her dance engagements.

Mainstream appearances
Rotten appears with pornographic actresses Asphyxia Noir and London Keyes in the music video for the 2013 song "Kiss Land" by The Weeknd.

In January 2014, Rotten was featured in a music video for the song "Let's F**k" by Los Angeles band Piece by Piece along with Terror drummer Nick Jett. The video debuted on Vimeo.

In 2013, LA Weekly ranked her fifth on their list of "10 Porn Stars Who Could Be the Next Jenna Jameson". She was also placed on CNBC's list of "The Dirty Dozen: Porn's Most Popular Stars" in 2014.

In 2014, The Daily Beast referred to Rotten as "Porn's current 'It' girl" in an article about the annual AVN Awards at which she won "Female Performer of the Year". Though declaring that the porn industry had "died," performer Joey Silvera is quoted as saying: "there is still enough magic left that the awards can make a difference for Bonnie if she wins."

Other ventures 

In January 2014, Rotten launched her own production company (Mental Beauty, Inc.) and signed a distribution deal with Girlfriends Films. She made her directorial debut with the film To the Core. She also directed Sisters of Anarchy for Digital Playground.

Tattoos 

Rotten has over thirty tattoos, and her stage name comes from a so-named pin-up zombie that she has tattooed on the back of her right leg. In one instance, she claimed that her favorite tattoo is the one on her stomach, featuring a zombie from the comic book Night of the Living Dead: The Beginning, Issue 1. It was her first ever tattoo and took 13 hours to complete. In June 2013, she said that her favorite tattoo was of Frank Sinatra on her leg. In addition to the above list, Rotten also has a spiderweb on each of her breasts with the areola as the center of each web. She is credited with furthering the acceptance of porn performers with tattoos.

In 2017, she opened a tattoo shop with Gentle Jay from Ink Masters called 'Bonnie Rottens Best Kept Secret', where she employed tattooers Mark Mathews from ink Masters, and Jack Mayfair, a tattooer out of Brooklyn. The shop was open for one year. Citing differences between her and Jay the shop was closed in early 2018.

Personal life 

In May 2015, Rotten reported her pregnancy, giving birth to a girl later that year. Since she quit performing in February 2015, she has no plans to return to the adult film industry.

As of late 2021, Rotten was dating Jesse James. On June 25, 2022, she married James.

Awards and nominations

References

External links 

 
 
 

Alt porn
American female adult models
American female erotic dancers
American erotic dancers
American people of German descent
American people of Italian descent
American people of Jewish descent
American people of Polish descent
American pornographic film actresses
American pornographic film directors
American pornographic film producers
Living people
People from Hamilton, Ohio
Pornographic film actors from Ohio
Film directors from Ohio
Women pornographic film directors
1993 births
21st-century American women